The Minister for Roads, also known as the Minister for Highways and Minister for Roads and Freight was a minister in the Government of New South Wales who had responsibilities which included the development of road infrastructure and road pricing, and taxi and hire car policy and regulation.  The portfolio was combined with Transport in the Second Berejiklian ministry, along with the creation of a new portfolio of Regional Transport and Roads. The portfolio was abolished in the second Perrottet ministry in December 2021 when Natalie Ward was appointed Minister for Metropolitan Roads.

List of ministers
The following individuals have been appointed as Ministers for highways or roads.

Assistant ministers
The following individuals have been appointed as Assistant Ministers with responsibility for assisting or advising the Minister for Roads.

See also 

List of New South Wales government agencies

References

Roads